Moore Hall, also known as the William Moore House, is a historic home located in Schuylkill Township, Chester County, Pennsylvania. The house dates back to about 1722, and is a -story, five-bay by three-bay, fieldstone dwelling in the Georgian style.  It has a gable roof, two-story rear kitchen wing and sun porch. It was restored in the late-1930s. During the American Revolution the house served as headquarters for Col. Clement Biddle in late-1777 and early-1778, during the encampment at Valley Forge.  At that time, a committee of congress met at Moore Hall for three months and there decided that Gen. George Washington should serve as Commander in Chief of the Continental Army.  At the turn of the 20th century, the house was the summer home for Pennsylvania Gov. Samuel W. Pennypacker.

It was listed on the National Register of Historic Places in 1974.

References

External links
 William Moore House, State Route 23 & Reading Railroad Tracks vicinity (Schuylkill Township), Phoenixville, Chester County, PA: 7 photos, 15 data pages, and 1 photo caption page at Historic American Buildings Survey
  At Wikisource.

Historic American Buildings Survey in Pennsylvania
Houses on the National Register of Historic Places in Pennsylvania
Georgian architecture in Pennsylvania
Houses completed in 1730
Houses in Chester County, Pennsylvania
National Register of Historic Places in Chester County, Pennsylvania